Henry Ferrers  may refer to:

Henry Ferrers (antiquary) (died 1633), English antiquary
Henry de Ferrers, Norman soldier
Sir Henry Ferrers, 1st Baronet (died 1663), of the Ferrers baronets
Sir Henry Ferrers, 2nd Baronet (c. 1630–1675), of the Ferrers baronets
Henry Ferrers, 2nd Baron Ferrers of Groby (1303–1343), Baron Ferrers of Groby
Henry Ferrers, 4th Baron Ferrers of Groby (1356–1388), Baron Ferrers of Groby